Blayney Uniting Church is a heritage-listed Uniting church at Adelaide Street, Blayney, Blayney Shire, New South Wales, Australia. The property is owned by the Uniting Church in Australia. It was added to the New South Wales State Heritage Register on 2 April 1999.

History 

The first Methodist church in Blayney, then known as King's Plains, was a temporary church erected in 1843. It was under the charge of the minister at Bathurst until 1859, when the circuit was divided. The temporary church was replaced after nineteen years and is no longer extant.

The second Methodist church, now the church hall and Sunday school, was a brick church that opened in 1862 at a cost of £300. It was extended in 1912 and 1928.

The current church was built from 1885-86 at a cost of approximately £1,144 by Bathurst contractor James Atkins. The church, designed in the Victorian Carpenter Gothic style by architect James Hine, opened on 5 September 1886. It was renovated , and celebrated its 125th anniversary in 2011. 

The former parsonage was built in 1884.

It became the Uniting Church in 1977 following the merger of the Methodist, Congregational and Presbyterian churches.

Heritage listing 
Blayney Uniting Church was listed on the New South Wales State Heritage Register on 2 April 1999.

See also 

 List of Uniting churches in New South Wales

References

Attribution

External links

 

Blayney
Blayney, New South Wales
Uniting churches in New South Wales
Articles incorporating text from the New South Wales State Heritage Register
Churches completed in 1886
1886 establishments in Australia
Gothic Revival architecture in New South Wales
Victorian architecture in New South Wales
Gothic Revival church buildings in Australia